Desamparados is the 3rd canton in the province of San José in Costa Rica. The canton covers an area of 118.26 km², and has a population of 206,708, making it the third most populated among the 81 cantons of Costa Rica. The capital city of the canton is also called Desamparados.

The canton begins in the southern suburbs of the national capital city of San José, with the Río Tiribí marking its northern boundary. It snakes its way south in the shape of a backward ´S´, finally reaching its southern limit at the Río Tarrazú. It contains the bigger of the last forest lungs in the metropolitan area of Costa Ricans capital, the Loma Salitral, which conservation issues have generated social conflicts between community environmentalist and immobiliary developers, as it is seen as an identity mark of the desamparadeño people and a very important infiltration area to prevent the frequents and disastrous floods in the district of Gravilias.

Urban areas claim 80.4% of the canton's population. Those under age 10 make up 19.8% of its inhabitants, while 5.1% are over 65.

Districts
The canton of Desamparados is subdivided into 13 districts (distritos):

 Desamparados
 San Miguel
 San Juan de Dios
 San Rafael Arriba
 San Antonio
 Frailes
 Patarrá
 San Cristóbal
 Rosario
 Damas
 San Rafael Abajo
 Gravilias
 Los Guido

History
The canton was established by a legislative decree of November 4, 1862.

Sports
The football soccer club Orión F.C. de Desamparados plays here.

Demographics 

For the 2011 census, Desamparados had a population of  inhabitants.

Transportation

Road transportation 
The canton is covered by the following road routes:

Notable people
Máximo Fernández Alvarado
Joaquín Garcia Monge
Joel Campbell
Roy Miller
Laura Chinchilla
Jorge Alejandro Castro

References

Cantons of San José Province
1862 establishments in Costa Rica